"Milhouse of Sand and Fog" is the third episode of the seventeenth season of the American animated television series The Simpsons. It originally aired on the Fox network in the United States on September 25, 2005.

Plot
During Reverend Lovejoy's sermon, Maggie is scratching. The family takes Maggie to see Dr. Hibbert, who diagnoses Maggie with chicken pox. Inspired by Ned Flanders' suggestion of purposely exposing his sons to the chicken pox, Homer invites all the neighborhood kids over to the Simpson house for a "pox party". He ends up catching it himself, by drinking from Maggie's milk bottle, having no childhood immunity. Milhouse's parents Luann and Kirk attend the party, and after getting drunk on Marge's custom Margaritas, they resume their relationship.

Milhouse feels neglected because his parents are not fawning over him as they did while they were separated. He schemes to break them up again, and Bart helps him with a plot borrowed from The O.C.. The boys place a bra, belonging to Marge, on Kirk's bed. Luann finds the bra, assumes Marge is having an affair with Kirk, and informs Homer. When Homer confronts Marge, she angrily denies the allegation and kicks him out of the house.

Prodded by Lisa, Bart confesses to Marge that he left the bra in Kirk's bed, but Marge refuses to reconcile with Homer as he still does not trust her. In order to bring Homer and Marge back together, Lisa inadvertently influences Bart and Milhouse to plan to throw a dummy that looks like Bart off a cliff into the river below, while Homer and Marge, after receiving false messages from each other to meet, watch. However, after breaking his glasses, Milhouse accidentally pushes the real Bart off the cliff. Homer leaps into the rapids to rescue him, but they end up clinging on to a rock near a waterfall. There Bart confesses to Homer what he did, causing Homer to strangle him. Marge tells them to trust her, and let go of the rock. They let go and she catches them, swinging from a rope attached to a tree. Once safely on the river bank, Marge and Homer reconcile. They see Milhouse, thinking Bart died, jump off the cliff, leaving his fate unresolved. Marge wonders if Milhouse can swim, to which Bart asks "What do you think?"

References

External links 
 

The Simpsons (season 17) episodes
2005 American television episodes